The Minsk-Arena Ice Star, or simply Ice Star, is an international figure skating competition. Medals may be awarded in men's singles, ladies' singles, pairs, and ice dancing on the senior, junior, and novice levels. The inaugural event was held in September 2012 in Minsk, Belarus.

During periods of time when the stadium for the event is not used for competitions, the ice rink is rented out to the public for ice skating and hockey as well as used in other events throughout the year.

Senior medalists
CS: ISU Challenger Series

Men

Ladies

Pairs

Ice dancing

Junior medalists

Men

Ladies

Pairs

Ice dancing

Novice medalists

Men

Ladies

Ice dancing

References

 
International figure skating competitions hosted by Belarus
Sport in Minsk
2012 establishments in Belarus
Recurring sporting events established in 2012
ISU Challenger Series